The Irish Free Software Organisation (or IFSO) is a member organisation based in the Republic of Ireland which works to promote the use of free software in Ireland, and oppose legal or political developments which would interfere with the use or development of Free Software.

It is an associate organization of Free Software Foundation Europe (FSFE), with which it continues to maintain close ties.

History

IFSO was founded in January 2004 with the aims of promoting and protecting the freedom to study, modify and redistribute Free Software.

IFSO was founded as an extension of work on the EU Software Patents directive being performed by an ad hoc group, who perceived a threat to the Free Software community from that legislation. The organisation was intended to foster the Free Software community in Ireland, and to continue this legal and political work in a coherent manner.

Activities

 IFSO has been involved in organising several public lectures on Free Software, Software Patentability and other related topics.
 It has lobbied on the subject of the EU Software Patents directive, and other elements of European and Irish legislation.
 It has worked to raise awareness and promote the use of Free Software (for example, by participating in Software Freedom Day)

Structure

Although IFSO is a membership organisation, with a committee to provide structure, formal membership is considered less important than an individual's willingness to participate and take initiative. IFSO frequently collaborates with related organisations.

External links

 The IFSO website
 IFSO project: software patents
 Transcript from an IFSO event "Preventing Software Patents: How and Why"
 IFSO project: GPLv3
 IFSO project: promotion
 Free Software Foundation Europe
 Slashdot story on two GPLv3 talk transcripts published by IFSO

Free and open-source software organizations
2004 establishments in Ireland
Organizations established in 2004
Political organisations based in the Republic of Ireland